Frédérick Raynal  (born 1966) is a French video game designer and programmer, notable for his game developments in Infogrames, Adeline Software International and No Cliché. He is married to Yaël Barroz, a fellow game designer, with whom he has two children.

He is perhaps best known for Alone in the Dark, a game that established many conventions of the survival horror genre. Raynal also has a cult following for his Little Big Adventure series.

Raynal and other former Adeline members have repeatedly told fans that creating the third installment is made difficult by having to license or reacquire the rights to the franchise, which currently belong to Delphine Software International. However, Raynal has hinted that his current company, Ludoïd, which Raynal owns jointly with his wife, is attempting to negotiate the rights for a game to be called Little Big Adventure 3: Genesis of the Stellar Entity, and at least one sketch, by Didier Chanfray, related to development of the title has been leaked to the public, later to be confirmed as appurtenant by Raynal.

Career
Frederick Raynal was born in 1966 in Brive-la-Gaillarde, Corrèze (France). Beginning in his high school years, Raynal made early LED games including Laser (1979) for the ZX81. Shifting to software programming and working at his father's computer shop, Raynal's first commercial game, Robix 500 (1983), sold around 80 copies. During his time working here, Raynal also designed a suite of Minitel emulators: Minitelec (1986) for the Amstrad 464 through 6128 (Minitelec and Transmitelec), the Amstrad CPC6128 (Servitelec), and the PC-1512 (Minitelec Pro). He also produced graphics for the game PopCorn (1988), which was a moderate commercial success.

After joining the infant Infogrames he ported Alpha Waves (1990), a game which pushed new boundaries in gaming and is considered the first true 3D platform game. The port, from Atari ST to DOS, was actually a complete rewrite in C of the original Motorola 68000 assembly language code written by Christophe de Dinechin, after Raynal convinced Infogrames to make an exception to their policy of not porting assembly-language games. Convinced by his experience with Alpha Waves that the time was ripe for 3D graphics, he and his team soon went on to produce Alone in the Dark (1992), and worked on parts of the direct sequel (Alone in the Dark 2) before leaving the company. Alone in the Dark was a major contributor to the growth and success of Infogrames, and has since come to be widely regarded as a forefather of the survival horror genre. More importantly to Raynal himself, he became romantically involved with the game's graphic artist, Yaël Barroz, who gave birth to his first child shortly before Alone in the Dark was released.

Raynal formed Adeline Software International in 1993 with several former Infogrames members. With this new team, Raynal produced Little Big Adventure (1994), Time Commando (1996), and Little Big Adventure 2 (1997). He was also given special thanks on the PlayStation port of Fade to Black (1995).

Adeline was purchased by Sega in 1997 and became No Cliché. With No Cliché, Raynal and his team produced Toy Commander (1999), and Toy Racer (2000) both for Sega's Dreamcast system, and also helped Raster Productions into coding localisation for the European release of its Dreamcast Quake III Arena port (2000). During this time No Cliché also produced a spin-off entitled Toy Commander: Christmas Surprise (2000) as a free bonus with issue #10 of OD Magazine. For a time Raynal was also working on a survival horror game Agartha, which was cancelled due to Sega's decision to stop development on the Dreamcast. No Cliché remained together for a little while after the cancellation, attempting to create a PC port of Toy Commander. However, the group split before it could be finished.

Raynal went on to form F4-Toys (later F4) with Bruno Heintz where he began work on an action adventure game Trium Planeta. The game was to follow the style of Little Big Adventure, but was cancelled after a few months. Raynal also worked briefly at Little World Studio before forming his current company, Ludoïd. In 1997, Raynal was credited in the short film, Double Jeu.

On March 13, 2006, Raynal along with Shigeru Miyamoto and Michel Ancel were knighted by French Minister of Culture and Communication, Renaud Donnedieu de Vabres, as Knights of Arts and Literature. It was the first time that video game developers were honored this distinction.

Later, Raynal was involved as a consultant in the design of Soul Bubbles, a game for the Nintendo DS,  published by Eidos Interactive. He left the project in the spring of 2006 to start a new game with Ubisoft Montpellier: Battle Tag, a laser tag shooter game, which was released in November 2010. In 2010, he was linked to Treasure Hunter Institute, a MMO adventure game developed by Ubisoft. This project was canceled in April 2011.

In 2014, he founded a new studio, Gloomywood, and announced his new survival game 2Dark.

Several years later, on September, 2021, Raynal joined a newly formed studio named [2.21]  for the production of a new installment to the Little Big Adventure franchise. The release date is still unknown.

Games designed by Frédérick Raynal 
Independent
Laser (1979, ZX81)
Robix 500 (1986, PC) (A.K.A. Robix)
PopCorn (1988, PC)

With Infogrames
The Toyottes (1990, PC port of an earlier Amiga game)
SimCity CDTV (1990, PC port of an earlier Amiga CDTV game)
Alpha Waves (1991, PC port of an Atari ST game by Christophe de Dinechin)
Alone in the Dark (1992, PC)

With Adeline Software International
Little Big Adventure (1994, PC/PlayStation) (A.K.A. Relentless: Twinsen's Adventure)
Time Commando (1996, PC/PlayStation/Sega Saturn)
Little Big Adventure 2 (1997, PC) (A.K.A. Twinsen's Odyssey)

With No Cliché
Toy Commander (1999, Dreamcast)
Toy Commander: Christmas Surprise (2000, Dreamcast)
Toy Racer (2000, Dreamcast)
Agartha (canceled, Dreamcast)

With F4
Trium Planeta (canceled)

With Mekensleep (as contractor)
Soul Bubbles (2008, Nintendo DS) – consultant (2006)

With Ubisoft
Battle Tag (2010) – creative director
Treasure Hunter Institute (canceled)

With Ludoïd (as developer)
bOxOn (2011, PC/iPad/iPhone/iPod)

With Gloomywood (as developer)
2Dark (2017, PC/PS4/Xbox One)

References

External links

Ludoïd official website

1966 births
French video game designers
Chevaliers of the Ordre des Arts et des Lettres
People from Brive-la-Gaillarde
Living people
Video game programmers